I'll Get By is a 1950 American comedy musical film directed by Richard Sale, and starring June Haver, Gloria DeHaven and William Lundigan.

This story follows themes explored in 1940's Tin Pan Alley, with updated characters and music. The plot revolves around songwriters and their struggles in the music industry.

Plot
Song plugger Bill Spencer runs into Liza Martin, literally. He slams a door into her accidentally while rushing to bring a new recording to Peter Pepper, an influential New York disc jockey. The record breaks.

After he is fired, Bill opens his own music publishing business. He hires a secretary, Miss Murphy, and gains a partner in Freddy Lee, a young man from Texas, with whom he peddles a song that piano player Chester Dooley has written. They hear the singer Terry Martin is performing with trumpeter Harry James at a club, so they go there to pitch the song to her. Terry's sister is also in the act; she is Liza, the girl Bill once awkwardly met.

Freddy annoys Terry but the girls like the song, "I'll Get By," and agree to record it. Before long, it and they become huge successes. But, before a benefit in Hollywood, when the actress Jeanne Crain asks to perform the song, Bill says no because he promised it to Liza, but behind his back, Freddy agrees to let the actress have it. A furious Liza leaves Bill and refuses to listen to his attempts to explain.

The boys are drafted into the Marines, and when they report to a San Diego base, they run into Miss Murphy, who is now stationed there as an officer. After the boys ship out for duty, Miss Murphy goes out of her way to explain to Liza and Terry what happened with the song. The girls go on a USO show tour to the South Pacific where the guys have been sent, and all are reunited.

Cast
 June Haver as Liza Martin
 William Lundigan as William Spencer 
 Gloria DeHaven as Terry Martin
 Dennis Day as Freddy Lee
 Thelma Ritter as Miss Murphy
 Harry James as Harry James (himself)
 Jeanne Crain as Jeanne Crain (herself)
 Steve Allen as Peter Pepper
 Harry Antrim as Mr. Olinville
 Danny Davenport as Chester Dooley
 Dan Dailey as Pvt. Dan Dailey (himself)

Awards
Lionel Newman received a nomination for the 1951 Academy Award in the category of Best Music, Scoring for this film.

References

External links
 
 

1950 films
1950 musical comedy films
1950 romantic comedy films
American romantic musical films
American musical comedy films
American romantic comedy films
20th Century Fox films
Films directed by Richard Sale
Films scored by Lionel Newman
1950s romantic musical films
Films produced by William Perlberg
1950s English-language films
1950s American films